Maj. John Clark was an American spy for George Washington, and was primarily responsible for operating the intelligence network in and around Philadelphia during the British occupation of that city during the American Revolutionary War.

Early career

Clark was commissioned as a first lieutenant in the 1st Continental Infantry (Pennsylvania Rifles) on January 1, 1776, and was made a major of the 2nd Pennsylvania Battalion of the Flying Camp on September 14,  1776. He originally came to the attention of George Washington during the evacuation of Long Island and Manhattan. Directed to travel across Long Island Sound, he then scouted troop movements on Long Island.

Revolutionary War

Clark was responsible for operating one of the most notable spy rings organized and run by the Continental Army during the war, one which prevented the destruction of Washington's army at least three different times.

His most important assignment occurred during the period September to December 1777 when, despite a serious injury to his shoulder, he was tasked by Washington with obtaining information about General Howe's activities in Philadelphia. Clark set up a group of informants and couriers, and sent 30 detailed reports to Washington which allowed the Continental Army to react to British movements. When Clark set up a hoax in which he employed a false name while pretending to be a Quaker Loyalist who would inform on the Americans to General Howe, Howe was fooled, and offered Clark inducements to support the British cause. When Washington learned of this hoax, he prepared a false report of the Continental Army's strengths and planned movements, and ordered it delivered to Howe. A courier also acquired information about British activities while delivering messages on Clark's behalf. 

In December, with his wound still not healed, and after having not seen his wife in more than a year, Clark asked Washington to be released from service. Washington agreed, and introduced Clark to Henry Laurens, who gave Clark a desk job as auditor of Army expenses. For the remainder of his life, Clark lived quietly, and continued to maintain his secrecy regarding the names of the informants and couriers who helped him.

See also
Intelligence in the American Revolutionary War
Intelligence operations in the American Revolutionary War

Notes

References
Hastedt, Glenn P. Espionage: A Reference Handbook. Santa Barbara, California: ABC-CLIO, Inc., 2003., .
Rose, Alexander Washington Spies,
 Heitman, Historical Register of Officers of the Continental Army. .

Further reading
Clark, John J., Jr. "Letters from Major John Clark, Jr., to General Washington during the Occupation of Philadelphia by the British Army." 'Bulletin of the Historical Society of Pennsylvania, 1 (1845–1847).

Continental Army officers from Pennsylvania
Year of death unknown
Year of birth unknown
American spies during the American Revolution